Youngetta is an extinct genus of procolophonid from the Early Triassic of China. It contains a single species, Youngetta dongshengensis.

References 

Procolophonids
Prehistoric reptile genera